The Diocese of Elbląg is a Latin Church ecclesiastical territory or diocese located in the city of Elbląg in Poland. It is a suffragan diocese in the ecclesiastical province of the metropolitan Archdiocese of Warmia.

History
The diocese was established on March 25, 1992, as the Diocese of Elbląg from the Diocese of Chelmno, Diocese of Gdańsk and Diocese of Warmia. According to the Catholic Church statistics, 28.4% of the population went to church once a week in 2013 which was the lowest rank ever since 1980.

Leadership
Bishops of Elbląg
 Bishop Jacek Jezierski (since 2014.06.08)
Bishop Jan Styrna (2003.08.02 – 2014.05.10)
Bishop Andrzej Śliwiński (1992.03.25 – 2003.08.02)

Special churches
 Former Cathedrals:
 Konkatedra św. Jana Chrzciciela w Kwidzynie, Kwidzyn
 Konkatedra św. Wojciecha, Prabuty

See also
Roman Catholicism in Poland

Sources
 GCatholic.org
 Catholic Hierarchy
 Diocese website

Roman Catholic dioceses in Poland
Roman Catholic Diocese of Elbląg
Christian organizations established in 1992
Roman Catholic Diocese of Elbląg
Roman Catholic dioceses and prelatures established in the 20th century